Malevich, Malevič or Malewicz is a gender-neutral Slavic surname (Polish of Szeliga coat of arms, feminine Malewiczowa or Malewiczówna). Notable people with the surname include:
  (born 1938), Polish opera singer
 Marianna Malińska, also called Malewiczówna (1767–1797), Polish ballerina
 Kazimir Malevich (1878–1935), painter and art theoretician 
 Vladimir Malevich (born 1985), Russian ice hockey player

See also 
 Małujowice, named Malewicz in 1288, a village in south-western Poland
 Lt. Malewicz, a character from Three Stories (1953 film)

Slavic-language surnames